Stomphastis dodonaeae is a moth of the family Gracillariidae. It is known from South Africa and Madagascar.

The larvae feed on Dodonaea madagascariensis and Dodonaea viscosa. They mine the leaves of their host plant. The mine has the form of a moderate, irregular, oblong, transparent blotch mine which starts as a very long, narrow gallery.

References

Stomphastis
Moths of Madagascar
Moths of Africa